William Rees (1906 – October 1, 1961) was an American cinematographer who filmed 33 movies between 1923 and 1935. He worked with Frank Kesson in El cantante de Nápoles (1935).

Partial filmography
 When Danger Calls (1927)
Fancy Baggage (1929)
Hardboiled Rose (1929)
Hearts in Exile (1929)
Under a Texas Moon (1930)
Scarlet Pages (1930)
Murder at Midnight (1931)
The Maltese Falcon (1931)
The Kennel Murder Case (1933) 
The Case of the Howling Dog (1934)
Housewife (1934)
Fashions of 1934 (1934)
The Singer of Naples (1935)
Don't Bet on Blondes (1935)

References

External links

1906 births
1961 deaths
American cinematographers